The 2019 Everest Canadian Senior Curling Championships, Canada's national 50+ curling championship was held March 22 to 28 at the Chilliwack Curling and Community Centre in Chilliwack, British Columbia. The winning teams were supposed to represent Canada at the 2020 World Senior Curling Championships, but it was cancelled due to the COVID-19 pandemic.

This was the first event to be held at the new Chilliwack Curling and Community Centre facility.

The men's event was headlined by defending champions Bryan Cochrane of Ontario and two-time world champion Al Hackner of Northern Ontario. The women's event was headlined by defending champions Sherry Anderson (and 2018 World Senior champion) of Saskatchewan, 2006 Olympic bronze medallist Glenys Bakker of Alberta and four-time Tournament of Hearts bronze medallist Sherry Middaugh of Ontario, who made her seniors debut.

Men

Teams
The teams are listed as follows:

Round-robin standings
Final Round Robin Standings

Championship Pool Standings
Final Championship Pool Standings

Seeding Pool Standings
Final Seeding Pool Standings

Playoffs

Semifinals
Thursday, March 28, 8:30

Bronze-medal game
Thursday, March 28, 12:30

Final
Thursday, March 28, 12:30

Women

Teams
The teams are listed as follows:

Round-robin standings
Final Round Robin Standings

Championship Pool Standings
Final Championship Pool Standings

Seeding Pool Standings
Final Seeding Pool Standings

Playoffs

Semifinals
Thursday, March 28, 8:30

Bronze-medal game
Thursday, March 28, 15:30

Final
Thursday, March 28, 15:30

References

External links

2019 in Canadian curling
Canadian Senior Curling Championships
Curling in British Columbia
March 2019 sports events in Canada
2019 in British Columbia
Sport in Chilliwack